SV Orion is a Dutch amateur football club from the city of Nijmegen, founded on 19 September 1938. The first team of the club competes in the Hoofdklasse, the fifth tier of Dutch football, for the 2021/2022 season. The club's home stadium is the Sportpark Mariënbosch.

References

External links
Official website
Soccerway profile

Association football clubs established in 1938
1938 establishments in the Netherlands
Football clubs in the Netherlands
Football clubs in Nijmegen